Laurence Salzmann (born January 4, 1944) is an American photographer and filmmaker based in Philadelphia. His work, mostly documentary photography, focuses primarily on the lives of little known groups in America and abroad.

Life and work 
Salzmann was born January 4, 1944, in Philadelphia, Pennsylvania. He describes himself as being "of that generation which thought that photography could bring about socially beneficial change." Educated in Philadelphia schools, he acquired photographic skills along the way, often from older photographers. Much of his career has involved using photography to preserve the history of groups of people in danger of being ignored and forgotten and encouraging his subjects to retrieve memories and tell their stories.  Edward Sozanski, the late Philadelphia Inquirer art critic, wrote of Salzmann's work, "Cross a visual anthropologist with a talented photographer and you get Laurence Salzmann" and goes on to say that Salzmann's deep immersions in local cultures are  "what give his photographs exceptional resonance and poignancy."  (Phila. Inquirer, 2008)

Salzmann's first documentary project, "Family of Luis" (1965), came out of his assignment as a Peace Corps trainee in a barrio humilde of Ciudad Juarez.  It attracted the notice of the Photography Curator at the Philadelphia Museum of Art, Kneeland McNaulty, who bought several prints for their Museum Collection.  The "Family of Luis" essay led to Salzmann's being hired as a participant observer and photographer by St. Luke's Hospital Department of Community Psychiatry for a joint project with Columbia University. Again, he lived among his subjects, this time in a Single Room Occupancy hotel, on New York's upper West Side. documenting the lives of its residents. His work, Neighbors on the Block, was published by the New York State Council on the Arts. A grant from the American Film Institute for documentary film making enabled him and filmmaker Peter Barton to complete two films about residents of the hotels. Salzmann took courses in Sociology at the New School of Social Research and earned a Master of Arts in Visual Anthropology from Temple University (1971). This training, in addition to his photographic experience, led to work with Tim Asch as editor for several of the films (Children's Magical Death, New Tribes Mission, Tug of War, Weeding the Garden) in Asch's Yamomoto film series (1971) and as an editor on Alan Lomax's Choreometrics project. A Fulbright grant enabled Salzmann to spend 1974 – 1976 in the small Romanian town of Radauti, documenting the lives of the remaining members of its Jewish community who had survived the Holocaust.  Again, Salzmann learned the language of his subjects and lived among them.  His pictures were published in the book: The Last Jews of Radauti with text by Ayşe Gürsan-Salzmann, (Doubleday, 1983). His film, Song of Radauti was broadcast nationwide by PBS. At the invitation of Cornell Capa, Director of the International Center of Photography, a large selection of the Radauti pictures was shown at the International Center of Photography.

A grant from International Research & Exchanges Board allowed Salzmann to live for a year documenting the lives of Transhumant (migratory) shepherds in the Transylvania region of Romania. That work was published in book form under the title of Miortiza and shown in the Bucuresti Peasant Museum. At the invitation of the 500 Years Foundation Salzmann was invited to Turkey to produce a photographic essay on the Jews of that country. That project with a film took 5 years to complete and culminated in an exhibit, Anyos Munchos I Buenos  that was shown in museums in Israel, the Netherlands, Germany, France, and the United States, plus two books, and a documentary film.

Most recently, Salzmann has worked in Cuba, Mexico, and Peru, documenting the lives and work of artists and athletes in Cuba, the way of life left behind by Mexican migrants to Philadelphia. A second Fulbright Grant to Peru has provided funding for Salzmann to document ways in which pre-Hispanic culture continue on the lives and culture of Quechua speaking communities of Cusco's Sacred Valley Writing of Salzmann's La Lucha/The Struggle, a study of young athletes training in Castro's Cuba,  Miles Orvell wrote “ Salzmann's photographs constitute an aesthetic and social document of great power...and are a tribute to his generous vision of cross-cultural understanding.”  (The Photo Review, Vol. 28, No.3, pp 22–23, 2009) Summing up Salzmann's work, Jason Francisco, Associate Professor of Film and Media Studies at Emory College, has written “”The core intelligence of Salzmann's [work] is his non-didacticism, his unwillingness to forsake the suggestive for the merely explanatory ...”

Publications 
 2021 Llamas & Donkeys, Blue Flower Press, Philadelphia
 2021 Misk'I Kachi Runakuna // Sweet Salt People // Gente de Sal Dulce, Blue Flower Press, Philadelphia
 2018 Almendros, Blue Flower Press, Philadelphia
 2017 Misk’I Kachi // Sweet Salt // Sal Dulce, Blue Flower Press, Philadelphia. 
 2013 Several Weeks, Blue Flower Press, Philadelphia
 2012 EcheleGanas/ Do Your Best, Blue Flower Press, Philadelphia
 2010 in Search of Turkey's Jews, Libra Press, Istanbul.
 2006 La Lucha/The Struggle, Blue Flower Press, Philadelphia. 
 2005 De Noche//By Night, Artist's Book, Philadelphia.
 2002 Imagining Cutumba, Lafayette College, Easton, PA.
 1999 Miorita: An Icon of Romanian Culture, (ed.) with an introduction by Ernest H. Latham Jr. Essay by Alexandru Husar, Photographs by Laurence Salzmann, The Center for Romanian Studies, Iasi, Romania. 
 1995 Face to Face: Encounters between Jews & Blacks, Blue Flower Press, Philadelphia.
 1995 Fully Exposed: The Male Nude in Photography, Emanuel Cooper. Routledge, London.
 1995 The Male Nude: A Male View: An Anthology, ed. Peter Weiermair, Edition Stemmle, Zurich.
 1993 Mexico Through Foreign Eyes, eds. Carole Naggar and Fred Ritchin. W. W. Norton & Company, New York.
 1992 Flesh & Blood, Photographers’ Images of their Own Families, Picture Project.
 1990 Anyos Munchos i Buenos, co-authored with Ayse Gürsan-Salzmann, Blue Flower/Photo Review.
 1986 Männer Sehen Männer: Aktografie und ihre zeitgenössischen Vertreter, Peter Weiermair. Schaffhausen Verlag Photographie, Frankfurt.
 1983 The Last Jews of Radauti, co-authored with Ayse Gürsan-Salzmann, Dial/Doubleday.
 1980 La Baie/bath scenes, Han Books.
 1980 A Family Passover, Jewish Publication Society, Philadelphia. 
 1980 Stone Roses, poems from Transylvania by Keith Wilson, photographs by Laurence Salzmann, Utah State University Press.
 1978 Jerusalem's People in Public, portfolio, Blue Flower Press.
 1971 Neighbors on the Block, portfolio, published by New York State Council on the Arts.

Collections 
Salzmann's work is held in the following public collections:

 Museum of the Jewish People at Beit Hatfutsot, Tel Aviv.
 Brooklyn Museum of Art, NY.
 Bryn Mawr College, Library, Bryn Mawr, PA.
 Corcoran Gallery, Washington, D.C.
 Haverford College, Haverford, PA.
 High Museum of Art, Atlanta.
 International Center of Photography, New York.
 The Jewish Museum of New York, New York.
 Lehigh University Art Galleries (LUAG), Bethlehem, PA.
 Musée d'Art et d'Histoire du Judaïsme, Paris.
 Philadelphia Museum of Art, Philadelphia.
 Philadelphia Free Library, Philadelphia.
 Yale University, New Haven, CT.
 Widener Library, Harvard University, Cambridge, MA.

Films 
 2017  Tales of the Inca.
 2011  Revisiting Turkey's Jews, Vol. 1, 2011: Habib.
 2010 El Rayo
 2003	Imagining Cutumba, backstage with Balet Folklorico Cutumba Santiago.
 2003	Willy's Blessing, travels in Cuba with my friend Willy.
 1989	Turkey's Sephardim: 500 Years.
 1980	Who's havin' Fun, story of Philadelphia Mummers off and on Broad Street.
 1978	Song of Radauti, poetic rendition  of Jewish Life in a small town of Romania.
 1971	Scag: story of two young Philadelphians battle with heroin addiction.
 1970	Alfred, story of resident of Single Room Occupancy Hotel New York.
 1969	Eddie, story of resident of Single Room Occupancy Hotel New York.
 1966	The Ragman, story of one of last horse and wagon men of Philadelphia.

References

External links 
 Official Website
 Blue Flower Press – Laurence Salzmann's Publishing Site
 "Laurence Salzmann: A Lively Look at Areas' Mexican Culture" by Michael Matza, Philly Magazine (April 24, 2012) 
 "Local Photographer Displays Work at Haverford" (September 30, 2005)
 Laurence Salzmann – Center for Emerging Visual Artists

1944 births
Living people